Stewart, also known as Stewart's Station, is an unincorporated community in Hale County, Alabama, United States.

History
Stewart was founded in 1844 as a stop on the Alabama Great Southern Railroad. It was first called Stewart's Station, in honor of an early settler of the area, Charlie Stewart. A post office operated under the name Stewart's Station from 1871 to 1903, and under the name Stewart from 1903 to 1982.

Demographics

Stewart's Station was listed on the 1880 & 1890 U.S. Censuses, having briefly been an incorporated community. It was no longer listed as a town beginning in 1900, except for the county precinct #16 that also bore its name from 1900 to 1950.

References

Unincorporated communities in Hale County, Alabama
Unincorporated communities in Alabama